Crumhorn Lake is a lake located northeast of the hamlet of Portlandville in the Town of Milford in Otsego County, New York.

References 

Lakes of New York (state)
Lakes of Otsego County, New York